This is a list of attractions in Jaipur city in Rajasthan state in India.

Palaces and forts
Amer Fort
City Palace
Jal Mahal
Diggi Palace
Hawa Mahal
Jaigarh Fort
Nahargarh Fort
Rambagh Palace

Temples
Digamber Jain temple of Sanghiji, Sanganer
Birla Mandir
Galtaji 
Govind Dev Ji Temple
Kanak Vrindavan
Shila Devi temple

Gardens
Central Park
Jawahar Circle
Ram Niwas Garden
Sisodia Rani Garden and Palace

Museums
Albert Hall Museum
City Palace
Kanota Museum

Others
Jaipur Zoo
Jantar Mantar
Jawahar Kala Kendra
Raj Mandir Cinema
Rajasthan Assembly Building
Ramgarh Lake

Festivals
Elephant Festival
Gangaur
Teej

See also
Tourism in Rajasthan

Tourism in India

 
Visitor attractions
Jaipur
Jaipur